The Badger Television Network was an American state network that operated for eight months from January 1958 until it ceased operations on August 8 of that year. The regional television network was made up of three television stations in Wisconsin, WISN-TV (channel 12) in Milwaukee, WFRV-TV (channel 5, now a CBS affiliate) in Neenah/Green Bay and WKOW-TV (channel 27) in Madison. All three stations at the time were affiliates of ABC.

Programs broadcast by the network included Homemaker's Holiday, a quiz show hosted by Charlie Hanson; Good Housekeeping, a lifestyle program hosted by Trudy Beilfuss based on WISN-TV's sister publication via the Hearst Corporation; and Pretzel Party, a variety program originally hosted by Larry Clark. All three programs originated from Milwaukee affiliate WISN-TV. During March 1958, the network also aired Senate Investigating Committee hearings during late-night hours.

Schedule
 12:30–1:00 p.m. – Pretzel Party
 1:00–1:30 p.m. – Homemaker's Holiday
 1:30–2:00 p.m. – Good Housekeeping
 11:00 p.m.–12:00 p.m. – Hearings (March only)

References

Defunct television networks in the United States
Television channels and stations established in 1958
1958 establishments in Wisconsin
1958 disestablishments in Wisconsin